Enigmatichthys is a genus of extinct semionotiformid bony fish that lived during the Middle Triassic epoch of what is now Australia.

See also

 Prehistoric fish
 List of prehistoric bony fish

References

Middle Triassic fish
Semionotiformes
Prehistoric fish of Australia